Minuscule 889 (in the Gregory-Aland numbering), Θε430 (von Soden), is a 14th-century Greek minuscule manuscript of the New Testament on parchment, with a commentary.

Description 

The codex contains the text of the four Gospels, with a commentary, on 224 parchment leaves (size ). The text is written in one column per page, 32-34 lines per page.
The commentary is of Theophylact's authorship.

Text 
The Greek text of the codex is a representative of the Byzantine. Kurt Aland placed it in Category V.

It was not examined according to the Claremont Profile Method.

History 

According to C. R. Gregory it was written in the 14th century. The manuscript is also dated by the INTF to the 14th century. Gregory saw it in 1886.

The manuscript was added to the list of New Testament manuscripts by Scrivener (889e) and Gregory (889e).

Currently the manuscript is housed at the Biblioteca Marciana (Gr. Z. 30 (342)), in Venice.

See also 

 List of New Testament minuscules (1–1000)
 Biblical manuscript
 Textual criticism
 Minuscule 888

References

Further reading

External links 
 

Greek New Testament minuscules
14th-century biblical manuscripts